At the 1956 Summer Olympics in Melbourne, 33 athletics events were contested, 24 for men and 9 for women. There were a total number of 720 participating athletes from 61 countries.

Medal summary

Men

Women

Medal table

References
International Olympic Committee results database
Athletics Australia

 
1956 Summer Olympics events
O
1956